Tour d'Afrique is one of the longest bicycle expeditions in the world. It is organised by TDA Global Cycling, a Canadian company based in Toronto.  It runs each year from January to May, from Cairo to Cape Town. The participants are expedition riders who cover each day at their own pace, stopping in the villages and roadside cafes. There are about 20 rest days. The organisers prepare three meals every day and transport tents and other equipment the riders need for the night stops.

The 2003 Tour d'Afrique set a Guinness World Record for fastest crossing of Africa by bicycle and this was achieved by nine participants of the race, Michael Kennedy, Chris Evans, Dave Genders (all from the United Kingdom), Paul Reynaert (Belgium), Jeremy Wex, Steve Topham, Scotty Robinson, Andrew Griffin (all from Canada) and Sascha Hartl (Austria). The 2008 Tour d'Afrique did not cross Kenya due to the political situation and reported violence.

The race component of the Tour d'Afrique was suspended after 2017, with the event continuing as an annual cycling expedition.

Historical Race Results

References

Literature 
Hardy Grüne: Tour d'Afrique: 12 000 Kilometer Radrennen von Kairo nach Kapstadt, 2011

External links

Official site
Lonely Planet coverage of 2009

African international sports competitions
Cycling events